Vakpo is a town in the North Dayi district, a district in the Volta Region of Ghana. The town is known for the Vakpo Senior high School (Vasec) and Vakpo senior high Tech (Vastech) and its famous farm land called Dzogbega which produces garden eggs and mango farms for local consumption and export. The school is a second cycle institution.

References

Populated places in the Volta Region